McAlmont may refer to:

McAlmont, Arkansas, populated place in Arkansas, United States
David McAlmont (born 1967), English musician